Frank Hudson may refer to:
 Frank Hudson (aviator)
 Frank Hudson (American football)
 Frank Hudson (baseball)